Albert Bumford was a Welsh professional footballer who played as a left half.

Career
Born in Ton Pentre, Bumford played for Bristol City, Bradford City and Bangor City. For Bradford City, he made 10 appearances in the Football League.

Sources

References

Year of birth missing
Year of death missing
Welsh footballers
Bristol City F.C. players
Bradford City A.F.C. players
Bangor City F.C. players
English Football League players
Association football wing halves